This is a list of is of mixed martial arts events held by World Extreme Cagefighting. The first event, WEC 1, took place on June 30, 2001. The first event held under Zuffa management, WEC 25, took place on January 20, 2007. The final event, WEC 53, took place on December 16, 2010.

Events

Event locations
Total event number: 53

These cities have hosted the following numbers of WEC events as of WEC 53: Henderson vs. Pettis:

  United States (52)
 Lemoore, California – 22
 Las Vegas, Nevada – 15
 Sacramento, California – 4
 Glendale, Arizona - 1
 Highland, California – 1
 San Diego, California – 1
 Broomfield, Colorado – 1
 Uncasville, Connecticut – 1
 Hollywood, Florida – 1
 Chicago, Illinois – 1
 Rio Rancho, New Mexico – 1
 Columbus, Ohio – 1
 Corpus Christi, Texas - 1
 San Antonio, Texas - 1

  Canada (1)
 Edmonton, Alberta – 1

See also
List of UFC events
List of PRIDE events
List of Strikeforce events
List of K-1 events

References

External links
 WEC Results at Sherdog.com

WEC